The Yonge Street riot was a civil disturbance that occurred in Toronto, Ontario, Canada, on the night of May 4, 1992.

Events 
Originally, the protest had been focused on Rodney King, as the officers that beat King had recently been acquitted. However, a young Black man named Raymond Lawrence was killed in Toronto on May 2 by two officers of the Peel Regional Police. Accordingly, the protest grew to encompass Lawrence's killing as well.

The protest began at the United States consulate on University Avenue, and then moved to the intersection of Yonge and Bloor Streets. It was led by the Black Action Defence Committee. Witnesses noted that many engaged in looting and violence were white skinheads.

Aftermath 
Following the disturbance, according to a contemporaneous report in the Toronto Star, Ontario premier Bob Rae called for "reforms" in the "education and justice systems". Rae tasked Stephen Lewis with drafting a report to analyze the causes of the disturbance. Alexander and Glaze summarize Lewis's conclusions as follows: "[w]hile the LAPD trial verdict, and the May 2 Toronto police shooting death … acted as catalysts, the root causes of black unrest were simmering frustration over police mistreatment, discrimination in employment and housing, and a school system dominated by Eurocentric curricula."

References

Sources

Further reading

External links 
 

1992 in Ontario
1990s in Toronto
Protests in Canada